Piping Technology and Products is a privately owned pipe support manufacturing and engineering company headquartered in Houston, Texas, United States. Its wholly owned subsidiaries are US Bellows, Sweco Fab, Fronek Anchor/Darling Enterprise, and Pipe Shields. These companies provide pipe supports, expansion joints, shock and vibration controls, and pre-insulated supports to a variety of industries including LNG, chemical, petrochemical, pulp & paper, and aerospace.

History
 1975: Durga D. Agrawal and Alan Muller entered into a partnership and established an engineering and consulting company called Stress Technology & Products. The company specialized in design engineering and computerized stress analysis, but evolved into a manufacturing and fabrication business over the next three years.
 1978: The company was reorganized as Piping Technology & Products, Inc. and developed the constant load spring hanger design.
 1986: Acquired Sweco, Fab. Inc., an ASME U-Stamp Shop that designs and fabricates pressure vessels, pig launchers and receivers, instrument supports, conical strainers, spectacle and line blinds, orifice plates and flanges, duct and transition pieces, bellmouth reducers and dampers / louvers.
 1995: Acquired RM Manufacturing from RM Engineered Products of Ladson, South Carolina. Began manufacturing metallic expansion joints.
 1997: Acquired US Bellows from Ketema LP of San Diego, California
 2003: Launched field services division and began services calls, installations and maintenance
 2004: Acquired Fronek Group
 2011: Launched 3D printing of Pipe supports and expansion joints to evaluate designs

References

Manufacturing companies based in Houston
Manufacturing companies established in 1978
Technology companies established in 1978
Privately held companies based in Texas